David Davis (August 5, 1936 – November 4, 2022) was an American television producer and television writer. He co-created the sitcoms The Bob Newhart Show (with Lorenzo Music) and Taxi (with James L. Brooks, Stan Daniels, and Ed. Weinberger). In 1979, he won a Primetime Emmy Award for his producing work on Taxi.

Personal life and death
Davis was born in Brooklyn on August 5, 1936. His father, Phil Davis, was a writer for the game shows Truth or Consequences and This Is Your Life. He moved to Los Angeles during his childhood, and attended the University of California, Los Angeles, where he studied film. 

Davis had two daughters, Samantha and Abigail, from his marriage to Joann Leeson, which ended in divorce in 1972. Davis was in a relationship with actress Julie Kavner from 1976 until his death. They met on the set of Rhoda, a series Kavner co-starred. At the time of his death, it was reported that Kavner was in fact his wife. In his tribute to Davis on his Twitter account, James L. Brooks also claimed that Davis and Kavner were in fact married.

Davis died in Los Angeles on November 4, 2022, at the age of 86.

References

External links

1936 births
2022 deaths
Television producers from New York City
American television writers
American male television writers
Primetime Emmy Award winners
Writers from Brooklyn
Screenwriters from New York (state)
20th-century American screenwriters
20th-century American male writers